The 2018–19 Idaho Vandals men's basketball team represented the University of Idaho in the Big Sky Conference during the 2018–19 NCAA Division I men's basketball season. Led by eleventh-year head coach Don Verlin, the Vandals played their home games at Cowan Spectrum, with a few early season games at Memorial Gym, both on campus in Moscow, Idaho. They finished the season at 5–27 (2–18 in Big Sky, last). Idaho lost in the first round of the conference tournament to Montana State.

On June 14, 2019, head coach Don Verlin was fired amid possible NCAA violations. He finished at Idaho with an 11-year record of 177–176.

Previous season 
The Vandals finished the 2017–18 season 22–9, 14–4 in Big Sky play to finish in second place. They lost in the quarterfinals of the Big Sky tournament to Southern Utah.

Offseason

Departures

Incoming transfers

2018 recruiting class

Preseason

Roster

Schedule and results 

|-
!colspan=9 style=|Exhibition

|-
!colspan=9 style=| Non-conference regular season

|-
!colspan=9 style=| Big Sky regular season

|-
!colspan=9 style=| Big Sky tournament

References 

Idaho
Idaho Vandals men's basketball seasons
Idaho
Idaho